The 12 Hours of Reims (official name: 12 Heures internationales de Reims) were a sports car endurance racing series held in 1965 at the circuit Reims (Gueux).

Race report 

 Championnat du Monde des Constructeurs - 1965: Grands Prix de France Reims - Trophée Fédération française des Sports Automobiles
 July 4, 1965,  Circuit Reims (France) - 8.302 km,  World Sportscar Championship (round 13)
 Classes Prototypes: +3000 cc (P+3.0), 1300 cc (P1.3)
 Classes Grand Touring: +3000 cc (GT+3.0), 3000 cc (GT3.0), 2000 cc (GT2.0), 1300 cc (GT1.3)
 Pole Position overall:  #3 Ferrari 365 P2,  Pedro Rodriguez, 2:18.2 - 216.234 km/h
 Fastest Lap overall:    #2 Ferrari 365 P2,  John Surtees, 2:17.9 - 216.705 km/h

Results Overall

Winners by class

References 

12 Hours of Reims
12 Hours of Reims